Waking Up Laughing is the ninth studio album by American country music singer Martina McBride. It was released on April 3, 2007, through RCA Nashville. This album is the first in McBride's career in which she has both co-written songs and been involved in the production single-handedly. This album produced three chart singles for McBride on the US Billboard Hot Country Songs chart with "Anyway" at #5, "How I Feel" at #15, and "For These Times" at #35. The album was certified Gold by the 
RIAA.

Content
Waking Up Laughing is the first album of McBride's career in which she co-wrote any of the material. McBride wrote the lead-off single "Anyway" with Brad and Brett Warren of The Warren Brothers. This song reached #5 on the Hot Country Songs charts in early 2007, becoming McBride's first Top 10 country hit in three years. The Warren Brothers and McBride also co-wrote "How I Feel", the second single, with Chris Lindsey and Aimee Mayo.

"For These Times" was inspired by former Republican senator Rick Santorum, who was defeated in 2006, and his daughter. When his daughter began to cry at his loss, the cameras focused on her, inspiring Leslie Satcher to write the song. It was also inspired by her Pastor, who stated "For these times in which we live, you are going to need this book." referring to the Bible. The song received a 2009 Grammy nomination.

"Cry Cry ('Til the Sun Shines)" was covered by former Trick Pony lead vocalist Heidi Newfield on her debut solo album, What Am I Waiting For, from which it was released as a single in November 2008.

Track listing

Personnel 
 Martina McBride – lead vocals, harmony vocals(2, 8, 9)
 Steve Nathan – acoustic piano (1, 4, 7, 10, 11), Hammond B3 organ (1, 4, 6, 8, 9), synthesizers (10, 11)
 Reese Wynans – Hammond B3 organ (2, 3)
 Tim Lauer – synthesizers (3), accordion (8, 10), pump organ (10)
 Gordon Mote – acoustic piano (5)
 B. James Lowry – acoustic guitar
 Bryan Sutton – mandolin (1, 4, 8), acoustic guitar (2, 3, 4, 6, 7, 8, 11)
 Biff Watson – acoustic guitar (6, 9, 10)
 Dan Dugmore – electric guitar (1, 2, 4, 6, 9), steel guitar (3, 7, 8, 10, 11), dobro (5)
 Brent Mason – electric guitar (1-5, 7, 9, 11), acoustic guitar (8)
 Paul Worley – electric guitar (2, 5, 6, 10), acoustic guitar (5)
 Keith Urban – guitar solo (3), harmony vocals (3)
 J.T. Corenflos – electric guitar (5)
 Steve Gibson – electric guitar (5)
 Dann Huff – electric guitar (5, 6, 9, 10, 11)
 Stuart Duncan – mandolin (3), fiddle (3)
 Jonathan Yudkin – mandolin (10),  strings (10) string arrangements (10)
 Paul Franklin – steel guitar (1)
 Glenn Worf – bass
 Matt Chamberlain – drums
 David Huff – percussion (2-10)
 Larry Franklin – fiddle (1, 8)
 Anthony LaMarchina – cello (6, 7)
 Kristin Wilkinson – viola (6, 7), additional string arrangements (6), string arrangements (7)
 David Davidson – violin (6, 7)
 Karen Winklemann – violin (6, 7)
 Wes Hightower – harmony vocals (1, 9)
 Troy Johnson – harmony vocals (1, 9)
 Brett Warren – harmony vocals (2, 6)
 Bob Bailey – harmony vocals (4)
 Kim Fleming – harmony vocals (4)
 Vicki Hampton – harmony vocals (4)
 Carolyn Dawn Johnson – harmony vocals (8)
 Jenifer Wrinkle – harmony vocals (10)

The Nashville String Machine on "Anyway" and "How I Feel"
 David Campbell – arrangements and conductor 
 Bettie Ross – concertmaster on "How I Feel"
 Eberhard Ramm – music copyist 
 Kirsten Cassel, Anthony LaMarchina, Carole Rabinowitz and Sarighani Reist – cello 
 Monisa Angell, Jim Grosjean, Gary Vanosdale and Kristin Wilkinson – viola 
 David Angell, David Davidson, Conni Ellisor, Carl Gorodetzky, Stefan Petrescu, Pamela Sixfin, Elisabeth Small, Alan Umstead, Cathy Umstead, Mary Kathryn Vanosdale, Bruce Weathy and Karen Winklemann – violin

Choir on "For These Times"
 Renita Smith Crittenden, Darlene Hill, Rick Jones, Calvin Settles, Fallon Settles, Ira Wayne Settles, Odessa Settles, Sara Settles, Shirley Settles, Todd Suttles, Elizabeth White and Pierre Womble

Production 
 Martina McBride – producer 
 John McBride – recording, mixing 
 Allen Ditto – recording assistant, mix assistant 
 Al Schmitt – additional engineer (3)
 Aaron Walk – assistant engineer (3)
 Richard Dodd – mastering at RichardDodd.com (Nashville, Tennessee)
 Paige Connors – production coordinator 
 Carole Ann Mobley – A&R direction
 Judy Forde-Blair – creative production, liner notes 
 S. Wade Hunt – art direction, design 
 Andrew Southam – photography 
 Mary Beth Felts – make-up
 Claudia Fowler – wardrobe stylist 
 Earl Cox – hair stylist 
 Bruce Allen – management

Chart performance

Weekly charts

Year-end charts

Singles

Certifications

References

2007 albums
Martina McBride albums
RCA Records albums